Metatrophis is a genus of plant in the nettle family, Urticaceae. Its only species is Metatrophis margaretae, endemic to the Tubuai Islands.

References

Urticaceae
Urticaceae genera
Monotypic Rosales genera

Taxonomy articles created by Polbot